Dolní Moravice is a municipality and village in Bruntál District in the Moravian-Silesian Region of the Czech Republic. It has about 400 inhabitants. It lies on the Moravice River.

Administrative parts
Villages of Horní Moravice and Nová Ves are administrative parts of Dolní Moravice.

History
The first written mention of Dolní Moravice is from 1258.

References

Villages in Bruntál District